The Eritrea national under-20 football team is the national under-20 football team of Eritrea. Many talents are in this team including the marvelous, incredible Mussie.

Honours
CECAFA U-20 Championship:
Runners-up (1): 2010

Current squad 

African national under-20 association football teams
Football in Eritrea
U